Medial cutaneous may refer to:
 Medial cutaneous nerve of arm
 Medial cutaneous nerve of forearm
 Anterior cutaneous branches of the femoral nerve of the upper leg
 Medial sural cutaneous nerve of the lower leg
 Medial crural cutaneous branches of saphenous nerve
 Medial dorsal cutaneous nerve of the foot